Nikolaevsk is a census-designated place (CDP) in Kenai Peninsula Borough in the U.S. state of Alaska. As of the 2020 census, the population of the CDP is 328, up from 318 in 2010. Nikolaevsk School serves school-age children from the area.

History
The town was settled by a group of Old Believers of the Russian Orthodox Old-Rite Church around 1968, and remains a largely ethnic Russian town to this day. The travels of the group from Russia, as well as the story of the founding of Nikolaevsk, is told in a 1972 article in National Geographic, a 2013 episode on the NatGeo channel called "Red Alaska", and a 2013 article in The Atlantic magazine.

Geography
Nikolaevsk is on the west side of the Kenai Peninsula at  (59.813043, -151.668387). It is bordered to the south and west by the Anchor Point CDP and to the north by the Happy Valley CDP. Road access is via the North Fork Road, which junctions with the Sterling Highway  to the west in Anchor Point.

The North Fork of the Anchor River forms the southern border of the community, and the Chakok River forms the western border.

Nikolaevsk is in the boreal wet forest biome, according to the Holdridge life zones system.

Climate
Nikolaevsk features a subarctic climate (Köppen: Dfc) with short, quite mild summers and long, cold winters. Nikolaevsk experiences a significant marine influence.

Demographics

Nikolaevsk first reported on the 1990 U.S. Census as a census-designated place (CDP).

As of the census of 2000, there were 345 people, 96 households, and 72 families residing in the CDP.  The population density was 9.5 people per square mile (3.7/km2).  There were 122 housing units at an average density of 3.4/sq mi (1.3/km2).  The racial makeup of the CDP was 81.74% Caucasian, 1.74% Native American, 0.29% Asian, 1.16% Pacific Islander, 2.03% from other races, and 13.04% from two or more races.  0.29% of the population were Hispanic or Latino of any race.

Out of the 96 households, 57.3% had children under the age of 18 living with them, 65.6% were married couples living together, 5.2% had a female householder with no husband present, and 24.0% were non-families. 18.8% of all households were made up of individuals, and 2.1% had someone living alone who was 65 years of age or older.  The average household size was 3.59 and the average family size was 4.33.

In the CDP, the population was spread out, with 45.2% under the age of 18, 7.8% from 18 to 24, 26.4% from 25 to 44, 17.1% from 45 to 64, and 3.5% who were 65 years of age or older.  The median age was 21 years. For every 100 females, there were 104.1 males.  For every 100 females age 18 and over, there were 119.8 males.

The median income for a household in the CDP was $42,625, and the median income for a family was $39,375. Males had a median income of $28,750 versus $10,956 for females. The per capita income for the CDP was $10,390.  About 15.8% of families and 19.2% of the population were below the poverty line, including 20.9% of those under age 18 and 16.7% of those age 65 or over.

References

Census-designated places in Alaska
Census-designated places in Kenai Peninsula Borough, Alaska
Russian communities in the United States
Russian-American culture in Alaska
Old Believer communities in the United States
Populated places established in 1968
1968 establishments in Alaska